Charles Harley Mansur (March 6, 1835 – April 16, 1895) was a U.S. Representative from Missouri.

Born in Philadelphia, Pennsylvania, Mansur attended Lawrence Academy, Groton, Massachusetts.
He studied law and was admitted to the bar in Richmond, Missouri, August 30, 1856.
He moved to Chillicothe, Missouri, in 1856 and practiced law.
He served as a member of the board of education of Chillicothe for eight years.
He served as a member of the Democratic State central committee 1864–1868.
He served as a delegate to the Democratic National Convention in 1868 and 1884.
He served as prosecuting attorney of Livingston County 1875–1879.
Joint nominee of the Democrats and Liberal Republicans for Congress in 1872, and again the nominee of the Democrats in the same district in 1880.

Mansur was elected as a Democrat to the Fiftieth, Fifty-first, and Fifty-second Congresses (March 4, 1887 – March 3, 1893).
He was an unsuccessful candidate for renomination in 1892.
He was appointed by President Cleveland as second Comptroller of the Treasury on May 29, 1893, and served until September 30, 1894.
Assistant Comptroller from October 1, 1894, until his death in Washington, D.C., April 16, 1895.
He was interred in Sunny Slope Cemetery, Richmond, Missouri.

References

1835 births
1895 deaths
Democratic Party members of the United States House of Representatives from Missouri
School board members in Missouri
Comptrollers of the United States Treasury
19th-century American politicians
Politicians from Philadelphia
Burials in Missouri
People from Chillicothe, Missouri
19th-century American businesspeople